Anversa degli Abruzzi is a comune and town in the province of L'Aquila in the Abruzzo region of southern Italy.

History 

In the surrounding areas between the Cenozoic and Mesozoic there was a carbonate sedimentation (the rocks near contain various carbonates, mainly including calcium carbonate in the form of compact limestone).

In the 20th century the population underwent a significant population decline (especially for places that offer better job opportunities, including Sulmona).
The population fell from 1,934 inhabitants in 1901, to the current just over 300 inhabitants.

Main sights
 Giardino Botanico Gole del Sagittario 
 Norman Castle
 Church of San Marcello

References

 
Hilltowns in Abruzzo